George Oakley Totten Jr. (December 5, 1866 – February 1, 1939), was one of Washington D.C.’s most prolific and skilled architects in the Gilded Age. His international training and interest in architectural decoration led to a career of continuous experimentation and stylistic eclecticism which is clearly evident in many of his works.  The mansions he designed were located primarily on or near Dupont, Sheridan (including Embassy Row), and Kalorama circles and along 16th Street, N.W., near Meridian Hill. Most now serve as embassies, chanceries, or offices for national or international organizations, their important public or semi-public functions, combined with their urbanistically integrated close-in locations, make them particularly visible exemplars of Washington's peculiar mixture of turn-of-the-century political and social life.

Biography

Totten was born in New York City on December 5, 1866, a son of George Oakley and Mary Elizabeth (Styles) Totten and a descendant of John Totten, from whom Tottenville, Staten Island, was named.  After receiving his early education at public schools in Newark, New Jersey and the Newark Technical School, he graduated from Columbia University with a Ph.B in 1891 and an A.M. in 1892. He was awarded Columbia's McKim travelling fellowship in 1893, and for the next two years studied at the Ecole des Beaux Arts and Atelier Daumet-Esquie. He returned to the United States and in 1896, was appointed chief designer in the Office of the Supervising Architect, Department of the Treasury. He continued in that position until 1898, when he established an independent architectural practice in Washington D.C., which he continued until his demise.

He was the architect for many public buildings in that city and drew plans for ten legations and embassy buildings, including the Turkish, Polish, Belgian, Norwegian, Spanish, Swedish, and Danish legations, and the former French embassy.  He was an advisor when the U.S. Capitol Building was remodelled.  He also designed many private city and country dwellings in Washington, including a group of houses in the 2600 block of  16th Street, N.W., representing several styles of architecture. He also designed homes in Vermont and New Jersey.  He was architect for a number of government buildings including the post office at Waterbury, Connecticut and the $3 million post office and federal court building at Newark, New Jersey, that opened in 1934.

In 1923, he rescued architect H. H. Richardson's Warder Mansion (1885–88), at 1515 K Street NW, from demolition. He disassembled the stonework and some of the interiors, transported them about 1.5 miles from downtown to Meridian Hill, and re-erected the building alongside his house for use as apartments. The Warder Mansion is the only surviving building by Richardson in Washington, D.C.

He was active in professional architecture related associations.  From 1897 to 1939, he served as secretary and vice president of the American section of the permanent committee of the International Congress of Architects.  During World War I, he served as a major with the Army Corps of Engineers. In 1926, he authored Maya Architecture.

On August 22, 1921, he married noted sculptor and artist Vicken von Post-Börjesson of Sweden. They had two sons:  George Oakley Totten III, Distinguished Professor Emeritus of Political Science
from the University of Southern California, and Gilbert von Post Totten. He died at Washington, D.C., on February 1, 1939.

Selected works 
Christian Hauge House, 2349 Massachusetts Ave., NW, Washington, D.C. - 1906 (now Embassy of Cameroon)
Congressional Club, 2001 New Hampshire Avenue NW, Washington, D.C., NRHP-listed
Franklin MacVeagh House (the "Pink Palace"), 2600 16th St., NW, Washington, D.C. - 1906  (now headquarters of Inter-American Defense Board)
Moran House, 2315 Massachusetts Ave., NW, Washington, D.C. - 1908 (now Embassy of Pakistan)
Edward Hamlin Everett House, 1606 23rd St., NW, Washington, D.C. - 1914  (now Residence of the Ambassador of Turkey)
2535 15th St., NW, Washington, D.C. - 1922 (now Embassy of Ecuador)
Josephine Butler Parks Center, Washington, D.C., NRHP-listed 
Langley Park, Langley Park, Maryland - 1924 (now CASA of Maryland multicultural services building)
Meridian Hall, 2401 15th St., NW, Washington, D.C., NRHP-listed
Embassy Building No. 10, 3149 16th Street, NW, Washington, D.C., built 1928, Renaissance Revival, NRHP-listed

References

 District of Columbia Historic Preservation Review Board, Staff Report and Recommendations regarding 2230 Massachusetts Ave., NW, Mar 27, 2008 (accessed Sep 30, 2008).
 Library of Congress, Prints & Photographs Division, "Residential Architecture of Washington, D.C., and its Suburbs," online essay by Pamela Scott (accessed Sep 30, 2008).
Who Was Who in America, 1897–1942, (1942, New York: A.N. Marquis, Co.), p. 1247.
The National Cyclopaedia of American Biography, Vol. XLI, (1956, New York: James T. White Co.), p. 496.

Gallery

External links
Photograph of the Residence of the Ambassador of Turkey (Flickr website) (accessed Oct 1, 2008).
Embassy.org website, The Turkish Embassy Ambassador's Residence (accessed Oct 1, 2008).

1866 births
1939 deaths
Architects from New York City
Architects from Washington, D.C.
American alumni of the École des Beaux-Arts
Preservationist architects
Columbia Graduate School of Architecture, Planning and Preservation alumni
New Jersey Institute of Technology alumni
19th-century American architects
20th-century American architects